The 2011–12 season Real Betis season was the club's 95th season in its history and its 47th season playing in La Liga, the top division of Spanish football, following promotion after winning the Segunda División. It covers a period from 1 July 2011 to 30 June 2012.

Real Betis competed for their second La Liga title and will enter the Copa del Rey in the round of 32.
Real Betis started to win its first four games. Betis' final match of the Liga was at Málaga, a 2–0 victory.

Current squad
Updated 31 August 2011

Transfers

In

Total expenditure:  €1,600,000

Out

Total income:  €4,500,000

Club

Coaching staff

Competitions

La Liga

League table

Results summary

Results by round

Matches

Copa del Rey

References

External links
  

Spanish football clubs 2011–12 season
2011–12 Real Betis season